Luiz Felipe de Azevedo (born 17 August 1953) is a Brazilian equestrian. He was born in Rio de Janeiro. He won a bronze medal in show jumping at the 1996 Summer Olympics in Atlanta with the Brazilian team, and again at the 2000 Summer Olympics in Sydney.

References

1953 births
Living people
Sportspeople from Rio de Janeiro (city)
Brazilian male equestrians
Olympic equestrians of Brazil
Olympic bronze medalists for Brazil
Equestrians at the 1996 Summer Olympics
Equestrians at the 2000 Summer Olympics
Olympic medalists in equestrian
Medalists at the 2000 Summer Olympics
Medalists at the 1996 Summer Olympics
Pan American Games medalists in equestrian
Pan American Games gold medalists for Brazil
Equestrians at the 1991 Pan American Games
Medalists at the 1991 Pan American Games
Medalists at the 1995 Pan American Games
Medalists at the 1999 Pan American Games
21st-century Brazilian people
20th-century Brazilian people